Splicing factor, arginine/serine-rich 16 is a protein that in humans is encoded by the SFRS16 gene.

References

Further reading